Deweyville is an unincorporated community in Hancock County, in the U.S. state of Ohio.

History
Deweyville was laid out in 1880. A post office called Deweyville was established in 1880, and remained in operation until 1927.

References

Unincorporated communities in Hancock County, Ohio
Unincorporated communities in Ohio